Hospital San Juan de Dios in Bogotá housed the National Institute of Immunology where important research on vaccines, notably the first synthetic vaccine against malaria, was conducted, The Instituto Meterno-infantil, Hospital La Hortúa (Psychiatric Wing) and the Santa Clara Clinic currently. It is one of the oldest serving hospitals in Latin America. It was founded in 1723 in times of the colony, yet its operation dates back the 1564 and was called Hospital de San Pedro and was established with the properties donated by Bishop Juan de los Barrios. It was later called Hospital de Jesús, José y María and finally Hospital San Juan de Dios. It initially consisted of three buildings of republican architectural style. The main building was modeled after the Pasteur Institute in France. and was finished in 1921. Later, a 1960 style high-rise building was constructed to house the hospital, and the original buildings were left abandoned.

History
The wing underwent remodeling and was restored to its initial architectural beauty. Patarroyo's laboratory is one of the leading institutes in the world renowned for their work on the development of the first synthetic vaccine for malaria.

The hospital remained one of the main academic medical centers until 1999 and was the main hospital for National University of Colombia the largest public medical school in Colombia. It was owned and managed by a foundation, and after the national restructuring of Colombian health system into a private captive health insurance system, (known as Ley 100 de 1993) the hospital became financially insolvent mainly because it stopped receiving direct state support for uninsured emergencies and procedures for the poorest residents of the city. The bankruptcy of the hospital led to expropriation of its assets by lenders through 2006. All of the equipment of Patarroyo's laboratory was repossessed and the institute closed. The institute was re-established and relocated as the Fundación Instituto de Inmunología de Colombia.

The hospital was acquired by the City of Bogotá in 2015 and currently undergoes renovation. Most of the delay has been due to legal issues surrounding the will of the donor of the land and the legal suits between the city of Bogotá, and the Cundinamarca Department to determine ownership and the negotiations to avoid the eviction of squatters who occupied the building after its closure in addition to unsolved pensions owed to former employees. While some of the buildings cannot be demolished because of their designation as cultural and historical site the multinational firm COPASA has been hired by the city to demolish part of the complex and build a new complex. The contract was signed by mayor Claudia López in February 2020.

References

Hospitals in Colombia
Defunct hospitals
Hospitals established in the 16th century
Buildings and structures in Bogotá
National Monuments of Colombia